Adam of Ross was an Irish Cistercian monk who fl. 1279.

An Anglo-Irish native of New Ross, County Wexford, Adam is believed to have been a member of the Cistercian monastery at Dunbrody, County Wexford. He was the author of a translation into French of the Vision of St. Paul. He was a severe moralist, encouraging the use of French in Ireland for religious purposes. Adam wrote his translations for the benefit of his brothers in religion, specifically on how to avoid going to Hell.

References

 Hiberno-Norman literature, Evelyn Mullally, in Settlement and Society in Medieval Ireland: Studies presented to F.X. Martin, Dublin, 1988.

13th-century Irish writers
Christian clergy from County Wexford
13th-century books
Manuscripts
Translators to French
Normans in Ireland
Irish Cistercians
13th-century Irish Roman Catholic priests
Year of birth unknown
Year of death missing